The Esso Australian Jazz Summit is a live compilation album of jazz music recorded live at the Bondi Beach. The album was nominated for 1987 ARIA Award for Best Jazz Album.

Background
The Esso Australian Jazz Summit was held on Saturday 22 February 1986 at Sydney's Bondi Beach. The Summit had 13 acts set to play but the show wash rained out after only 10 had performed. Don Burrows Quintet, Sandy Evans Trio, Southern Cross Jazz Quartet, Andy Sugg and Andy Vance Duo, Dave Dallwitz Sydney Big Band, Allan Browne Band, Merve Acheson and the Mainstreamers, Jazzmanian Quartet, Rick Price Quartet and NSW Conservatorium Big Band all performed. Nova Dreams, Schmoe and Co and the Bernie McGann Quartet were listed did not get to play.

The summit was recorded by the Australian Broadcasting Corporation and was broadcast on ABC TV as part of The Burrows Collections series. A double album was released later that year through ABC Records.

Reception
The album was nominated as the Best Jazz Album at the inaugural ARIA Awards.

Writing in The Canberra Times, Michael Foster praised the album stating "The music is exuberant, the recording and engineering worthy of the musicians."

Track listing
Side 1
Toad – NSW Conservatorium Big Band conducted by Don Burrows
Sketch – NSW Conservatorium Big Band featuring Don Burrows on Saxophone
Gospel Dance – Rick Price Quartet
O'Pato – Rick Price Quartet
Side 2
Jersey Lightning – The Allan Browne Band
Wild Man Blues – The Allan Browne Band
Witchhunt – Southern Cross Jazz Quartet
Come On Mama – Sandy Evans Trio
Side 3
Straight No Chaser – Joe Lane with the Don Burrows Quintet with James Morrison on Trumpet
Where Would I Go Without You – Joy Mulligan with the Don Burrows Quintet
Now Is The Time – Andrew Firth with the Don Burrows Quintet with James Morrison on Trumpet
Chasing Your Tail – Andy Sugg And Andy Vance Duo
Side 4
If I Had You – Merv Acheson and the Mainstreamers
Under Those Chandeliers – Jazzmanian Quartet
Shanghai Shuffle – Dave Dallwitz Sydney Big Band
Milenburg Joys – Dave Dallwitz Sydney Big Band
Sugarfoot Stomp – Dave Dallwitz Sydney Big Band

References

External links

Compilation albums by Australian artists
Live albums by Australian artists
Jazz albums by Australian artists
Jazz compilation albums
Live jazz albums
1986 compilation albums
1986 live albums